Guiron may refer to:

 Guiron le Courtois, a character in Arthurian legend
 Guiron, a monster in the film Gamera vs. Guiron